Pykobjê (also Gavião-Pykobjê) Pykobjê-Gavião, Gavião, Pyhcopji, or Gavião-Pyhcopji) is a dialect of Pará Gavião, a Northern Jê language, spoken by the Gavião-Pykobjê people in Terra Indígena Governador close to Amarante, Maranhão, Brazil.

Krĩkatí (also Krinkati or Krikati) is spoken by the Krĩkatí people in Terra Indígena Krikati in Maranhão.

There is a Krĩkatí-Portuguese dictionary by a New Tribes Mission missionary.

The remainder of this article describes Pykobjê specifically.

Morphology

Finiteness morphology
As in all other Northern Jê languages, verbs in Pykobjê inflect for finiteness and thus have a basic opposition between a finite (or short) form and a nonfinite (or long) form. Finite forms are used in matrix non-past clauses only, whereas nonfinite forms are used in all types of subordinate clauses as well as in some matrix clauses (such as past, negated or quantified). Nonfinite forms are most often formed via suffixation and/or prefix substitution. Some verbs (including all descriptives with the exception of cato ‘to leave, to arrive, to appear’, whose nonfinite form is cator) lack an overt finiteness distinction.

The following nonfinite suffixes have been attested: -r (the most common option, found in many transitive and intransitive verbs), -n (found in some transitive verbs), as well as -c, -m, and -x (found in a handful of intransitive verbs which take a nominative subject when finite).

Prefix substitution or loss
In addition to the aforementioned processes, the finiteness inflection may involve prefix substitution or loss. For example, the valency-reducing prefixes are a(j)- (anticausative) and a(a)-, aw- (antipassive) in finite verb forms, but -pe(e)h-, -pẽh- and -jỳ-,/-jõh-, respectively, in the nonfinite forms. In addition, some verbs which denote physiological activities or movement have a prefix (ehj- and aa-, respectively) in their finite forms but not in the nonfinite form. Some examples are given below.

Derivational morphology

Productive affixes
Pykobjê widely uses the diminutive suffix -re and the augmentative suffix -teh, which may combine with nouns and descriptive predicates.

Instrumental/locative nominalizations are formed by means of the suffix -xỳ, which attached to the nonfinite forms of verbs.

References

Jê languages
Languages of Brazil